

Aulus Cornelius Cossus was a Roman general from the early Republic. He is most famous for being the second Roman, after Romulus, to be awarded the spolia opima, Rome's highest military honor, for killing the commander of an enemy army in single combat. Only three Romans ever achieved this feat, but a fourth winner was officially denied the honor by a jealous Consul Caesar Octavianus (later Augustus) who insisted the honor was limited exclusively to Roman commanders. Cornelius Cossus proves otherwise.  

The achievement happened at the Battle of Fidenae in 437 BC when Rome faced the forces of Fidenae (a Roman colony in revolt) allied with both the Falerii and Veii, among Rome's most longstanding and powerful enemies. The Romans fought under the command of Dictator Mamercus Aemilius Mamercinus, the enemy fought under the command of King Lars Tolumnius of Veii. According to Livy's account, the "remarkably handsome" cavalry officer Cornelius Cossus identified the king during battle and promptly charged him, unhorsing him with his spear. Cornelius Cossus nimbly used the spear to vault off his own horse, and as Lars Tolumnius attempted to get back on his feet, Cornelius Cossus smashed him back to the ground with the boss of his shield. As the king sprawled on the ground, Cornelius Cossus speared him several times, killing him. He then decapitated the king, spiked his head on his spear and paraded it before his now-leaderless enemy army, which panicked and fled.  

The People & Senate agreed to award Dictator Mamercus Aemilius Mamercinus a Triumph for the victory, but Aulus Cornelius Cossus, winner of the spolia optima, became the triumph's central focus. Following Romulus' example, Cornelius Cossus solemnly placed his spolia optima secunda (a display of the king's sword, shield, and armor) near Romulus' spolia optima prima inside the Temple of Jupiter Feretrius on the Capitoline Hill. 

In 428 BC Cornelius Cossus was elected to Rome's highest office, at the time called praetor, later consul. The year was mostly known for a horrible drought and plague. There was no rain, the streams and lakes dried up, and even the Tiber barely flowed. Cattle died in huge numbers from thirst, the survivors died from disease. People began getting sick from the cattle, and all sorts of foreign superstitions took hold, and religious scammers became so common the aediles were ordered to ensure only Roman gods were worshipped in the prescribed, traditional manner.

In 426 BC Cornelius Cossus was elected one of four consular tribunes (tribunus militum consulari potestate) a wartime senior magistracy, abolished in 367 BC by the Lex Licinia Sextia. Cossus is to hold Rome while the other three consular tribunes (Gaius Furius Pacilus Fusus, Marcus Postumius and Titus Quinctius Pennus Cincinnatus) lead the Roman army to Veii, where they are defeated more by their own unwillingness to work together than they are by the Veientes. 

The people were panicked and demanded a dictator to avenge this defeat, so Consular Tribune Cornelius Cossus nominated his commander Mamercus Aemilius Mamercinus from the Battle of Fidenae. Since his triumph, Aemilius Mamercinus had his citizenship degraded by the Censors in retribution for reducing their terms. The Senate agreed with the nomination and appointed Aemilius Mamercinus dictator. He, in turn, appointed Cornelius Cossus his second-in-command, magister equitum (master of the horse). 

The dictator recalled the army home from Veii and ordered them to set up a fortified position outside the Colline gate. A garrison was placed on the city walls, the city was shut down, and Mamercinus called for a public assembly. He gave a speech framing the prior defeat as nothing more than an insignificant reversal of fortune and reproached everyone for getting carried away on their emotions. He explained that the loss was not because of any deficiency of the Roman army, or any great accomplishment by the enemy but a mere failure of leadership, and reminded Rome that they have beat the Veientines already six times- they had captured Fidenae almost more often than it had been attacked. He reminded them that he'd already defeated a combined force of Veii, Fidenae, and Faliscans and his lieutenant was Cornelius Cossus, hero of Rome, the man who'd won the spolia opima! He concluded by enumerating the crimes and outrages of the enemy and promised that when he attacked the enemy he would guarantee the Roman people a far better service than the Censors who'd attacked him. 

On the following day, the Romans marched to within a mile of Fidenae and the battle is joined. Things were going well for the Romans until a huge army armed only with torches floods out of the city gates and into the Roman army like berserkers. The Romans panic, but Aemilius Mamercinus got them back in the fight then ordered the cavalry attack. Cornelius Cossus had already ordered his cavalry to remove the bits from their horses, and between the dust they kicked up and the smoke, the horses could not see the fire, much less be afraid of it. Everywhere the Roman cavalry went it left heaps of dead. The Romans took the enemy camp, then the enemy city, looted them both, and Aemilius Mamercinus and Cornelius Cossus once again returned to Rome at the head of victorious Roman army.

Livy notes that A. Cornelius Cossus is elected Praetor (Consul) in 413 BC, but doesn't identify him as being the man who won the spolia optima; it may be his namesake son. Diodorus Siculus and Cassiodorus say it was not Aulus Cornelius Cossus, but rather his son Marcus Cornelius Cossus. This year is missing from the Fasti Capitolini list of Rome's highest magistrates.

References

Sources
 T. R. S. Broughton, The Magistrates of the Roman Republic. Vol. 1: 509 B.C. – 100 B.C., Case Western Reserve University Press, Cleveland/Ohio, 1951.
 Anthony Everitt, The Rise of Rome. The making of the Worlds's Greatest Empire, 2012. 
 L. Richardson, jr, A New Topographical Dictionary of Ancient Rome, Baltimore - London, 1992. p. 219 
 Livy - Ad Urbe Condita

External links
 Ancient history - Veientine Wars - 3 Fifth Century Wars Between Veii and Rome

5th-century BC clergy
5th-century BC Roman consuls
Ancient Roman generals
Characters in Book VI of the Aeneid
Cossus, Aulus
Magistri equitum (Roman Republic)
Pontifices maximi of the Roman Republic